Kraisorn Sriyan (born November 16, 1983) is a Thai retired professional footballer who plays as a striker.

Honours

Club
Buriram PEA
 Thai Premier League (1): 2008

External links
 

Living people
1983 births
Kraisorn Sriyan
Kraisorn Sriyan
Association football forwards
Kraisorn Sriyan
Kraisorn Sriyan
Kraisorn Sriyan
Kraisorn Sriyan
Kraisorn Sriyan
Kraisorn Sriyan
Kraisorn Sriyan
Kraisorn Sriyan